Reginald Denys Pringle (born 20 September 1951) is a British archaeologist and medievalist. He is best known for his numerous publications regarding Crusader castles and Crusader-era churches in the Kingdom of Jerusalem, the 12th-13th century Crusader state in the Holy Land.

Education and career
Pringle received a Diploma in Elementary Italian at the Università per Stranieri di Perugia in 1970, then studied Archaeology and History at the University of Southampton (BA) from 1970 to 1973. He later had his DPhil in Archaeology at the Keble College, Oxford, where he received his doctorate in 1978 with a dissertation on "Sixth-century fortifications in Byzantine Africa".

In 1977, he worked temporarily at the Queen's University of Belfast. From 1979 to 1984, he was the Assistant-Director of the British School of Archeology in Jerusalem. In 1984–1985, he was a Fellow in Byzantine Studies and Fulbright Scholar at the Harvard University. From 1986 to 1999, he worked as Principal Inspector of Ancient Monuments for the Historic Buildings and Monuments Directorate, Scotland. He then worked as a professor at Cardiff University from 2001 until 2013, when he retired.

Selected publications
 (See Burgata).

  Pringle, D. (2000). Fortification and Settlement in Crusader Palestine, Aldershot.
  Pringle, D. with R.P. Harper (2000). Belmont Castle: The Excavation of a Crusader Stronghold in the Kingdom of Jerusalem. Oxford: Oxford University Press for the Council for British Research in the Levant.

Awards
 2003: Prix Gustave Schlumberger of the Académie des Inscriptions et Belles-Lettres.

Family tree

References

1951 births
Living people
British archaeologists
British historians
British medievalists
Alumni of the University of Southampton
Alumni of the University of Oxford
Academics of Cardiff University
Fellows of the Society of Antiquaries of London
Fellows of the Society of Antiquaries of Scotland
Historians of the Crusades